Vega de Viejos or La Vega de los Viejos (Astur-Leonese: Veiga Viechos) is a locality located in the municipality of Cabrillanes, in León province, Castile and León, Spain. As of 2020, it has a population of 42.

Geography 
Vega de Viejos is located 92km northwest of León, Spain.

References

Populated places in the Province of León